Moscow Leningradsky railway terminal  (Leningradsky vokzal) also known as Moscow Passazhirskaya station is the oldest of Moscow's nine railway terminals. Situated on Komsomolskaya Square, the station serves north-western directions, notably Saint Petersburg. International services from the station include Tallinn, Estonia, operated by GoRail, and Helsinki, Finland.

It is the only Moscow railway terminal operated by October Railway rather than Moscow Railway.

History

The station was constructed between 1844 and 1851 to an eclectic design by Konstantin Thon as the terminus of the Moscow-Saint Petersburg Railway, a pet project of Emperor Nicholas I. Regular connection was opened in 1851. Initially it was known as Peterburgsky (i.e., St Petersburg station). Upon the Emperor's death five years later, the station was named Nikolayevsky (and the railway Nikolayevskaya) after him and retained this name until 1924, when the Bolsheviks renamed it Oktyabrsky terminal (and the corresponding railway to October railway), to commemorate the October Revolution. The present name was given in 1937.

Thon's design follows closely that of the station's counterpart in St. Petersburg. The monotonous regularity of rustication and pilasters is enlivened with Italianate details (ground floor windows strongly reminiscent of the Palazzo Rucellai) and an elegant clocktower at the centre (probably inspired by the Palazzo Senatorio in Rome). Even more rigorous is the exterior of the nearby Moscow Customs House (1844–1852), also by Thon. The interior of the station was modernized and renovated in 1950 and 1972.

Destinations

Long distance from Moscow

There are also numerous ordinary long range trains to these directions.

High-speed rail

High-speed commuter rail
Since 1 October 2015, Siemens Desiro RUS high speed commuter trains operating on Moscow-Tver and Moscow-Kryukovo (Zelenograd) routes. The major stops on the route are:Khimki, Kryukovo (Zelenograd), Podsolnechnaya (Solnechnogorsk) and Klin.

Other destinations

Suburban destinations
Suburban commuter trains (elektrichka) connect Leningradsky station with stations and platforms of the Leningradsky suburban railway line, in particular, with the towns of Khimki, Zelenograd (Kryukovo), Solnechnogorsk (Podsolnechnaya), Klin, Konakovo, and Tver.

Gallery

References

External links
Leningradsky station Official site 

Transport infrastructure completed in 1851
Railway stations in Moscow
Italianate architecture in Russia
Railway stations in the Russian Empire opened in 1851
1851 establishments in the Russian Empire
Cultural heritage monuments of federal significance in Moscow